Sergey Anatolyevich Kuryokhin (also transliterated as Sergei Kuriokhin, Sergei Kurekhin, Sergueï Kouriokhine, Sergey Kuriokhin, etc.; nicknamed "The Captain"; 16 June 1954 – 9 July 1996) was a Russian composer, pianist, music director, experimental artist, film actor and writer, based in St. Petersburg, Russia. Former keyboardist for the rock band Aquarium.

Biography
Kuryokhin began his performing career as a piano and keyboard player with a school band in Leningrad. After playing with professional jazz bands, as well as popular rock musicians, Kuryokhin went through several stages in his career and eventually became one of the most recognisable names and faces in Russia during the 1980s and 1990s.

By the end of his life, he had emerged as an avant-garde film composer, performance artist, and film actor. Outside Russia, he is primarily known as a jazz and experimental musician, through his works released since 1981 on UK's Leo Records, as well as his concert tours with Pop-Mechanics.

Kuryokhin shot to fame after creating one of the first popular media viruses in the Russian media. It was one of his semi-improvised acts of performance art, broadcast live on Russian television in May 1991. As a guest on the popular talk show Fifth Wheel, Kuryokhin provided "proof" that Lenin was a mushroom. 

During the 1990s, Kuryokhin was a board member of the St. Petersburg City Council for Culture and Tourism. In 1995 Kuryokhin joined the National Bolshevik Party.

Death
He died of a rare heart condition, cardiac sarcoma, aged 42 in 1996, and was laid to rest in the Komarovo Cemetery, near the tomb of Anna Akhmatova.

Legacy
The Saint-Petersburg Annual International Music Festival SKIF (Sergey Kuriokhin International Festival) is named after him. Kuryokhin festivals annually take place in Berlin, Amsterdam, and New York.

In 2004, the Sergey Kuryokhin Foundation and the Kuryokhin Center were founded. The foundation collects information about Kuryokhin and the Center organises events in the spirit of the artist. Both are located in the same building, an old cinema in Saint Petersburg. In 2009, the Sergey Kuryokhin Foundation and the Kuryokhin Center established the Sergey Kuryokhin Contemporary Art Award.

Discography
The Ways of Freedom  (Leo Records, 1981)
Tragedy in Rock  (1988)
Mr. Designer  (1989)
Popular Science  (1989) with Henry Kaiser
Album for Children  (1991)
Opera for the Rich  (1991)
Some combinations of fingers and passion (1991)
Sparrow Oratorium/Four Seasons  (1994)
Friends Afar (Sound Wave Records, 1996) with Kenny MillionsDear John Cage (Long Arm Records, 1996) with Kenny Millions
2 For Tea (Long Arms Records, 1998) with David Moss

Other works
Music for the stage production of the Chekhov's Chaika (aka The Seagull) (1994)
Music for the Russian TV series Anna Karenina (2007)
Also wrote Title Music for entire BBC TV series Comrades 1985 one episode of which featured him and other Leningrad Musicians and his Orchestra Popular mechanics
Mister Designer (1988)
Buster's Bedroom (1990)
Leading role as Pavel Gorelikov in Dude - Water Winner (1991)

See also
Without Kuryokhin, an album by Kenny Millions and Otomo Yoshihide  dedicated to the memory of Sergey.

References

Further reading

External links
  Biography
Full discography at Russian Association of Independent Genres
Official website of the Kuryokhin Centre for Modern Art

"Kuryokhin", documentary film (director Vladimir Nepevny)
Excerpt on Sergey Kuryokhin's Popular Mechanics from BBC documentary Comrades: All that Jazz

1954 births
1996 deaths
People from Murmansk
Soviet musicians
Russian musicians
National Bolshevik Party politicians
Deaths from cancer in Russia
Deaths from heart cancer
Russian record producers
Leo Records artists
Counterculture of the 1990s